Bejucal de Ocampo is a town and one of the 122 Municipalities of Chiapas, in southern Mexico. It covers an area of 82 km². It was named in honor of Mexican lawyer Melchor Ocampo.

As of 2010, the municipality had a total population of 7,623, up from 6,673 as of 2005. 

The municipality had 37 localities, none of which had a population over 1,000.

It is the least-Catholic municipality in Mexico’s least-Catholic state, with only 19% of residents being Catholic, and most being Jehovah’s Witnesses or Baptists.

References

Municipalities of Chiapas